This article lists concurrent and parallel programming languages, categorizing them by a defining paradigm. Concurrent and parallel programming languages involve multiple timelines.  Such languages provide synchronization constructs whose behavior is defined by a parallel execution model. A concurrent programming language is defined as one which uses the concept of simultaneously executing processes or threads of execution as a means of structuring a program. A parallel language is able to express programs that are executable on more than one processor. Both types are listed, as concurrency is a useful tool in expressing parallelism, but it is not necessary. In both cases, the features must be part of the language syntax and not an extension such as a library (libraries such as the posix-thread library implement a parallel execution model but lack the syntax and grammar required to be a programming language).

The following categories aim to capture the main, defining feature of the languages contained, but they are not necessarily orthogonal.

Coordination languages
 CnC (Concurrent Collections)
 Glenda
 Linda coordination language
 Millipede

Dataflow programming

 CAL
 E (also object-oriented)
 Joule (also distributed)
 LabVIEW (also synchronous, also object-oriented)
 Lustre (also synchronous)
 Preesm (also synchronous)
 Signal (also synchronous)
 SISAL
 BMDFM

Distributed computing

 Bloom
 Emerald
 Hermes
 Julia
 Limbo
 MPD
 Oz - Multi-paradigm language with particular support for constraint and distributed programming.
 Sequoia
 SR

Event-driven and hardware description

 Esterel (also synchronous)
 SystemC
 SystemVerilog
 Verilog
 Verilog-AMS - math modeling of continuous time systems
 VHDL

Functional programming

 Clojure
 Concurrent ML
 Elixir
 Elm
 Erlang
 Futhark
 Haskell
 Id
 MultiLisp
 SequenceL

Logic programming

 Constraint Handling Rules
 Parlog
 Prolog
 Mercury

Monitor-based 

 Concurrent Pascal
 Concurrent Euclid
 Emerald

Multi-threaded

 C=
 Cilk
 Cilk Plus
 Cind
 C#
 Clojure
 Concurrent Pascal
 Emerald
 Fork – programming language for the PRAM model.
 Go
 Java
 LabVIEW
 ParaSail
 Rust
 SequenceL

Object-oriented programming

 Ada
 C*
 C#
 JS
 TS
 C++ AMP
 Charm++
 Cind
 D programming language
 Eiffel SCOOP (Simple Concurrent Object-Oriented Programming)
 Emerald
 Java
 Join Java - A Java-based language with features from the join-calculus.
 LabVIEW
 ParaSail
 Python
 Ruby

Partitioned global address space (PGAS)

 Chapel
 Coarray Fortran
 Fortress
 High Performance Fortran
 Titanium
 Unified Parallel C
 X10
 ZPL

Message passing

 Ateji PX - An extension of Java with parallel primitives inspired from pi-calculus.
 Rust
 Smalltalk

Actor model

 Axum - a domain-specific language being developed by Microsoft.
 Dart - using Isolates
 Elixir (runs on BEAM, the Erlang virtual machine)
 Erlang
 Pony (programming language)
 Janus
 Red
 SALSA
 Scala/Akka (toolkit)
 Smalltalk
 Akka.NET
 LabVIEW - LabVIEW Actor Framework

CSP-based

 Alef
 Crystal
 Ease
 FortranM
 Go
 JCSP
 JoCaml
 Joyce
 Limbo (also distributed)
 Newsqueak
 Occam
 Occam-π – a derivative of Occam that integrates features from the pi-calculus
 PyCSP
 SuperPascal
 XC – a C-based language, integrating features from Occam, developed by XMOS

APIs/frameworks
These application programming interfaces support parallelism in host languages.
 Apache Beam
 Apache Flink
 Apache Hadoop
 Apache Spark
 CUDA
 OpenCL
 OpenHMPP
 OpenMP for C, C++, and Fortran (shared memory and attached GPUs)
 Message Passing Interface for C, C++, and Fortran (distributed computing)

See also
Concurrent computing
List of concurrent programming languages
Parallel programming model

References

Concurrent and parallel